Frank Tracey (1918 - 1971) was an English professional rugby league footballer who played in the 1930s and 1940s.

Playing career

International honours
Frank Tracey won caps for England while at St. Helens in 1939 against France, and in 1940 against Wales.

Other notable matches
Frank Tracey played  for a Rugby League XIII against Northern Command XIII at Thrum Hall, Halifax on Saturday, 21 March 1942.

References

External links
Profile at saints.org.uk
Statistics at wigan.rlfans.com

1918 births
1971 deaths
England national rugby league team players
English rugby league players
Rugby league centres
Rugby league five-eighths
Rugby league halfbacks
Rugby league players from St Helens, Merseyside
Rugby League XIII players
St Helens R.F.C. players
Wigan Warriors players